Rico's Combo were a studio band, that recorded on the Planetone label in the early 1960s.

History
The group, led by the Jamaican trombonist Rico Rodriguez, recorded some ska records for the Planetone record label in the early 1960s. When Rodrigues was not present on the recordings, the group would go by the name of The Planets.

Two tracks from this group, "London Here I Come" and "Hitch and Scramble", appeared on the Rodriguez's Trombone Man Anthology 1961-1971 CD.

Members
Rico Rodriguez - (Trombone)
Lovett Brown - (Saxophone)
Mike Elliott - (Saxophone)
Jackie Edwards - (Piano)

Discography
"London Here I Come" / "Midnight In Ethiopia" - Planetone RC 1
"Planet Rock" / "You Win" - Plantone RC 4
"Hitch and Scramble" / "Gee's Boogie" - Planetone RC 6
"Mighty As A Rose" / "Tell All Those Girls" (The Marvelles) - Planetone PT 35

References

British ska musical groups